Scott Garrison English (born October 20, 1950) is a retired professional basketball small forward who played in the National Basketball Association (NBA) and the American Basketball Association (ABA). Born in Evanston, Illinois, he attended Chatsworth High School, in Los Angeles, where he starred in the high jump, in track and field, clearing 6'7" his senior year. He attended the University of Texas at El Paso where he was selected during the third round of the 1972 NBA draft by the Phoenix Suns. He played for the Suns during the 1972–73 season. He spent the next two seasons in the ABA as a member of the Virginia Squires (1973–74) and the San Diego Conquistadors (1974–75).

External links

Living people
1950 births
American men's basketball players
Basketball players from Illinois
Phoenix Suns draft picks
Phoenix Suns players
San Diego Conquistadors players
Small forwards
Sportspeople from Evanston, Illinois
UTEP Miners men's basketball players
Virginia Squires players